Chase Sherman (born November 16, 1989) is an American professional mixed martial artist and former bare-knuckle boxer. A professional MMA competitor since 2014, he has competed for the UFC and Titan FC.

Background
Born and raised in D'Iberville, Mississippi, Sherman played football at D'Iberville High School. He continued with the sport on a scholarship to Jones Junior College, before transferring to NCAA Division II Delta State University after two years. At Delta State, Sherman helped the team reach the Division II National Championship in 2010 as an offensive tackle. Sherman also earned a bachelor's degree in sports management and exercise science from Delta State. In 2019, Sherman revealed that he had graduated from the fire academy, and is eligible to work as a firefighter.

Mixed martial arts career

Early career
After amassing an amateur record of 4–0, Sherman made his professional debut in April 2014. Over the next two years he fought ten times and amassed a record of 9–1; all of his wins came by TKO in the first round.

Ultimate Fighting Championship
Sherman made his promotional debut on August 6, 2016 at UFC Fight Night 92 against Justin Ledet. He lost the fight via unanimous decision.

Sherman next faced Walt Harris on January 15, 2017 at UFC Fight Night 103. He lost the fight by knockout in the second round.

For his third fight for the promotion, Sherman was scheduled to face Dmitry Poberezhets at UFC 211 on May 13, 2017. However, Poberezhets was removed from the card for undisclosed reasons and was replaced by newcomer Rashad Coulter. Sherman won the fight by knockout in the second round. The back-and-forth action earned both participants Fight of the Night honors.

Prior to his fourth fight in UFC, Sherman revealed he had signed a new, four-fight contract with UFC.

For his next fight, Sherman was tapped as a short notice replacement for Christian Colombo and faced Damian Grabowski on July 22, 2017 at UFC on Fox 25. He won the fight via unanimous decision.

Sherman faced Shamil Abdurakhimov on November 25, 2017 at UFC Fight Night 122. He lost the fight via knockout in the first round.

Sherman faced Justin Willis on April 21, 2018 at UFC Fight Night 128. He lost the fight via unanimous decision.

In what marked the last fight of his contract, Sherman faced Augusto Sakai at UFC Fight Night 137 on September 22, 2018. He lost the fight via TKO in the third round.

Post-UFC career
Sherman made his comeback to Island Fights 51 on December 21, 2018 against Frank Tate. He won by TKO in the first round.

Sherman next faced Jeremy May on February 7, 2019 at Island Fights 52. He won the fight by TKO in the very first round.

Sherman faced Rashaun Jackson on May 9, 2019, at Island Fights 56. He won the fight by TKO in the first round.

Sherman was then set to fight former M-1 Global Heavyweight Champion Kenny Garner on April 11, 2020, but the event was cancelled due to the COVID-19 pandemic.

Return to Ultimate Fighting Championship
Sherman returned to UFC and faced Ike Villanueva on May 13, 2020 at UFC Fight Night: Smith vs. Teixeira. Outclassing Villanueva on the feet, Sherman won the fight via technical knockout in round two. Sherman received nine month USADA suspension for testing positive for Anastrozole from a in-competition sample collected on May 13, 2020. He became eligible to fight again on February 13, 2021.

Sherman was scheduled to face Parker Porter on April 17, 2021 at UFC on ESPN 22. However, Porter was removed from the event for undisclosed reasons and was replaced by Andrei Arlovski.  Sherman lost the fight via unanimous decision.

Sherman faced Parker Porter on August 21, 2021 at UFC on ESPN 29. He lost the fight via unanimous decision.

As the last bout of his prevailing contract, Sherman faced Jake Collier on January 15, 2022 at UFC on ESPN 32. He lost the bout via rear-naked choke submission in round one.

After the loss, it was announced that Sherman's contract was not renewed.

Sherman was re-signed by the UFC four days after he was released the second time, as he replaced Tanner Boser against Alexander Romanov at UFC Fight Night: Lemos vs. Andrade. However, the fight was cancelled when Sherman was deemed unable to compete due to a "minor heath issue" on the day of the event and the pair was rescheduled for UFC on ESPN 35. Sherman lost the fight via keylock submission in the first round.

Sherman faced Jared Vanderaa on July 9, 2022, at UFC on ESPN: dos Anjos vs. Fiziev. He won the fight via TKO in round three. This win earned him the Performance of the Night award.

Sherman was scheduled to face Josh Parisian on November 5, 2022 at UFC Fight Night 214. However, Parisian pulled out of the fight hours before it was to take place due to medical issues.

Sherman  faced Waldo Cortes-Acosta on November 19, 2022, at UFC Fight Night 215. He lost the fight via unanimous decision.

Sherman is scheduled to face Chris Barnett on April 8, 2023, at UFC 287.

Bare-knuckle boxing
In the spring of 2019, Sherman signed a contract with the Bare Knuckle Fighting Championship. He faced Sam Shewmaker at Bare Knuckle FC 5 on April 6, 2019. The bout ended in a split draw.

In his second fight for the promotion, Sherman challenged Arnold Adams for the BKFC heavyweight title and Police Gazette Bare Knuckle title at Bare Knuckle FC 7 on August 10, 2019. He won the fight by unanimous decision.

Sherman was then set to defend the titles against Joey Beltran at Bare Knuckle FC 9 on November 16, 2019. After a hard-fought five rounds, Sherman lost the fight via unanimous decision.

Championships and accomplishments

Mixed martial arts
Ultimate Fighting Championship
Fight of the Night (one time) 
 Performance of the Night (One time)

Bare-knuckle boxing
Bare Knuckle Fighting Championship
BKFC Heavyweight Championship (one time; former)
Police Gazette Heavyweight Championship (one time; former)

Mixed martial arts record

|-
|Loss
|align=center|16–11
|Waldo Cortes-Acosta
|Decision (unanimous)
|UFC Fight Night: Nzechukwu vs. Cuțelaba
|
|align=center|3
|align=center|5:00
||Las Vegas, Nevada, United States
|
|-
|Win
|align=center|16–10
|Jared Vanderaa
|TKO (punches)
|UFC on ESPN: dos Anjos vs. Fiziev
|
|align=center|3
|align=center|3:10
|Las Vegas, Nevada, United States
|
|-
|Loss
|align=center|15–10
|Alexander Romanov
|Submission (keylock)
|UFC on ESPN: Font vs. Vera 
|
|align=center|1
|align=center|2:11
|Las Vegas, Nevada, United States
|
|-
|Loss
|align=center|15–9
|Jake Collier
|Submission (rear-naked choke)
|UFC on ESPN: Kattar vs. Chikadze
|
|align=center|1
|align=center|2:26
|Las Vegas, Nevada, United States
|
|-
|Loss
|align=center|15–8
|Parker Porter
|Decision (unanimous)
|UFC on ESPN: Cannonier vs. Gastelum 
|
|align=center|3
|align=center|5:00
|Las Vegas, Nevada, United States
|
|-
|Loss
|align=center|15–7
|Andrei Arlovski
|Decision (unanimous)
|UFC on ESPN: Whittaker vs. Gastelum
|
|align=center|3
|align=center|5:00
|Las Vegas, Nevada, United States
|
|-
|Win
|align=center|15–6
|Ike Villanueva
|TKO (punches and elbow)
|UFC Fight Night: Smith vs. Teixeira
|
|align=center|2
|align=center|0:49
|Jacksonville, Florida, United States
|
|-
|Win
|align=center|14–6
|Rashaun Jackson
|TKO (punches)
|Island Fights 56
|
|align=center|1
|align=center|0:59
|Orange Beach, Alabama, United States
|
|-
|Win
|align=center|13–6
|Jeremy May
|TKO (leg kicks)
|Island Fights 52
|
|align=center|1
|align=center|3:18
|Pensacola, Florida, United States
|
|-
|Win
|align=center|12–6
|Frank Tate
|TKO (punches)
|Island Fights 51
|
|align=center|1
|align=center|4:05
|Pensacola, Florida, United States
|
|-
|Loss
|align=center|11–6
|Augusto Sakai
|TKO (punches)
|UFC Fight Night: Santos vs. Anders 
|
|align=center|3
|align=center|4:03
|São Paulo, Brazil
|
|- 
|Loss
|align=center|11–5
|Justin Willis
|Decision (unanimous)
|UFC Fight Night: Barboza vs. Lee
|
|align=center|3
|align=center|5:00
|Atlantic City, New Jersey, United States
|
|-
|Loss
|align=center|11–4
|Shamil Abdurakhimov
|KO (punches)
|UFC Fight Night: Bisping vs. Gastelum
|
|align=center|1
|align=center|1:24
|Shanghai, China
|
|-
|Win
|align=center|11–3
|Damian Grabowski
|Decision (unanimous)
|UFC on Fox: Weidman vs. Gastelum 
|
|align=center|3
|align=center|5:00
|Uniondale, New York, United States
|
|-
|Win
|align=center|10–3
|Rashad Coulter
|KO (elbow)
|UFC 211
|
|align=center|2
|align=center|3:36
|Dallas, Texas, United States
|
|-
|Loss
|align=center|9–3
|Walt Harris
|KO (knee and punch)
|UFC Fight Night: Rodríguez vs. Penn
|
|align=center|2
|align=center|2:41
|Phoenix, Arizona, United States
|
|-
|Loss
|align=center|9–2
|Justin Ledet
|Decision (unanimous)
|UFC Fight Night: Rodríguez vs. Caceres
|
|align=center|3
|align=center|5:00
|Salt Lake City, Utah, United States
|
|-
|Win
|align=center|9–1
|Jack May
|TKO (leg injury)
|Titan FC 38
|
|align=center|1
|align=center|0:56
|Miami, Florida, United States
|
|-
|Win
|align=center| 8–1
| Sammy Collingwood
|KO (punches)
| Island Fights 37
| 
|align=center|1
|align=center|1:03
| Pensacola, Florida, United States
|
|-
|Win
|align=center| 7–1
|Russ Johnson
|KO (punch)
| FFI: Blood and Sand 17
|
|align=center|1
|align=center|1:40
| Biloxi, Mississippi, United States
|
|-
|Win
|align=center|6–1
|Brad Johnson
|TKO (punches)
|FFI: Blood and Sand 16
|
|align=center|1
|align=center|1:00
|Biloxi, Mississippi, United States
|
|-
|Loss
|align=center|5–1
|Alex Nicholson
|TKO (punches)
|Island Fights 31
|
|align=center|1
|align=center|N/A
|Pensacola, Florida, United States
|
|-
|Win
|align=center|5–0
|Wes Little
|TKO (punches)
|FFI: Blood and Sand 15
|
|align=center|1
|align=center|4:00
|Biloxi, Mississippi, United States
|
|-
|Win
|align=center|4–0
|Alex Rozman
|TKO (leg kick)
|Island Fights 30
|
|align=center|1
|align=center|N/A
|Pensacola, Florida, United States
|
|-
|Win
|align=center|3–0
|Justin Thornton
|TKO (punches)
|Island Fights 28
|
|align=center|1
|align=center|1:01
|Pensacola, Florida, United States
|
|-
|Win
|align=center|2–0
|Chris Jensen
|TKO (punches)
|Atlas Fights: Battle on Mobile Bay
|
|align=center|1
|align=center|0:11
|Mobile, Alabama, United States
|
|-
|Win
|align=center|1–0
|Braxton Smith
|TKO (punches)
|V3 Fights: Johnson vs. Johnson
|
|align=center|1
|align=center|2:08
|Memphis, Tennessee, United States
|

Bare knuckle record

|-
|Loss
|align=center|1–1–1
|Joey Beltran
|Decision (unanimous)
|Bare Knuckle FC 9
|
|align=center|5
|align=center|2:00
|Biloxi, Mississippi, United States
|
|-
|Win
|align=center|1–0–1
|Arnold Adams
|Decision (unanimous)
|Bare Knuckle FC 7
|
|align=center|5
|align=center|2:00
|Biloxi, Mississippi, United States 
|
|-
|Draw
|align=center|0–0–1
|Sam Shewmaker
|Draw (split)
|Bare Knuckle FC 5
|
|align=center|5
|align=center|2:00
|Biloxi, Mississippi, United States
|
|-

See also
List of male mixed martial artists
List of current UFC fighters

References

External links
 
 

Living people
1989 births
Heavyweight mixed martial artists
Mixed martial artists utilizing boxing
Mixed martial artists utilizing kickboxing
Mixed martial artists utilizing Brazilian jiu-jitsu
Mixed martial artists from Mississippi
American male mixed martial artists
People from D'Iberville, Mississippi
Ultimate Fighting Championship male fighters
American practitioners of Brazilian jiu-jitsu
Bare-knuckle boxers